Alessandro Gherardi (born 12 March 1988 in Pontedera) is an Italian footballer who currently plays as a midfielder for Ponsacco.

In August 2009 he was signed by Pergocrema.

On 31 January 2011 he was released by Triestina.

References

External links

Italian footballers
Italian expatriate footballers
Serie C players
ACF Fiorentina players
AC Bellinzona players
U.C. AlbinoLeffe players
U.S. Cremonese players
Calcio Lecco 1912 players
U.S. Pergolettese 1932 players
FC Chiasso players
U.S. Triestina Calcio 1918 players
Association football midfielders
Sportspeople from the Province of Pisa
Expatriate footballers in Switzerland
Italian expatriate sportspeople in Switzerland
1988 births
Living people
Footballers from Tuscany